Hugh Jesse Arnelle (December 30, 1933 – October 21, 2020) was an American basketball player and attorney.

Athletics
Born in New Rochelle, New York, Arnelle played football and basketball for Penn State University. He led the basketball team to the 1954 NCAA Final Four. He was named an All-American that season. Arnelle was also named to the 1954 NCAA All-Tournament team and the East Regional Most Valuable Player. Arnelle finished his Penn State basketball career as the program's all-time leading scorer and rebounder with 2,138 points and 1,238 rebounds.

He was drafted by the Los Angeles Rams in the 1955 NFL Draft, but chose to instead play in the NBA. He was selected by the Fort Wayne Pistons in the 2nd round (15th pick overall) of the 1955 NBA draft. He played for the 1955-56 Pistons in 31 games, averaging 4.7 ppg and 5.5 rpg, before breaking his nose in February 1956, ending his season.

Law and business
After professional basketball, Arnelle spent time in the United States Air Force and the Peace Corps. He graduated from Dickinson Law School in 1962, and in 1969 he moved to San Francisco and took the California bar exam. Once licensed to practice law in 1971, Arnelle worked as a trial lawyer in the public defenders office.

In 1987, Arnelle teamed with William Hastie to form the law firm of Arnelle & Hastie, San Francisco, (which later became Arnelle, Hastie, McGee, Willis and Green). He would serve as senior partner until his retirement from law in 1997. Black Enterprise magazine named Arnelle & Hastie one of the top 12 black law firms in the country in 1987. He was also Of Counsel to the law firm of Womble Carlyle Sandridge & Rice from 1997–2005.

Arnelle has served on the board of directors of URS Corp. since January 2004. Prior to that, he was on the boards of the Metropolitan Life Series Fund, Textron Corporation, Eastman Chemical Company, Gannett Company, Waste Management, Inc, Armstrong World Industries, Wells Fargo, and Florida Power & Light.

Personal
Arnelle became Penn State's first black student body president in 1955. He was elected to the university's Board of Trustees in 1969 and has since served the university in many roles, including the President's club, the Penn State Renaissance Fund, the Campaign Steering Committee and Penn State's National Development Council. He received the Lion's Paw award, given to distinguished alumni, in June 2000.

Arnelle died on October 21, 2020 at age 86.

See also
 List of NCAA Division I men's basketball players with 2000 points and 1000 rebounds

References

External links 

 "A 'Wow' Moment", CBS Interactive, February 15, 2008
Jesse Arnelle College Stats
Basketball.com Stats
REAL GM player profile
NFL.com player stats

1933 births
2020 deaths
African-American basketball players
African-American lawyers
All-American college men's basketball players
American football tight ends
American men's basketball players
Basketball players from New York (state)
California lawyers
Dickinson School of Law alumni
Fort Wayne Pistons draft picks
Fort Wayne Pistons players
Harlem Globetrotters players
Lawyers from New Rochelle, New York
Military personnel from New Rochelle, New York
Peace Corps volunteers
Penn State Nittany Lions basketball players
Penn State Nittany Lions football players
Players of American football from New York (state)
Power forwards (basketball)
Sportspeople from New Rochelle, New York
20th-century African-American sportspeople
21st-century African-American people
New Rochelle High School alumni